Ketzel, the Cat who Composed is a children's picture book by Lesléa Newman. Based on a true story, it is about the friendship between Moshe Cotel and a kitten, Ketzel, who composes a musical piece that Cotel enters into a music competition and receives a special mention.

Reception
Booklist gave Ketzel a star review,  wrote "this delightfully told story is unlikely and adorable in equal parts. Bates' watercolor, gouache, and pencil illustrations feature an unanthropomorphic kitty whose inquisitive and quizzical nature will be familiar to all cat owners." and found it "An absolute charmer!" and the School Library Journal called it "A delightful read."  Kirkus Reviews named it "Truly, the cat's meow." and Publishers Weekly, in a star review, wrote "a lovely tale of cross-species affection and creativity".

It was also reviewed by the Jewish Book Council, the Jewish Journal, and the Buffalo News.

Ketzel won the 2016 Massachusetts Book Awards Picture Book/Early Reader Award, and the 2016 Gold Sydney Taylor Book Award Younger Reader Category

References

External links
Library holdings of Ketzel, the Cat who Composed

2015 children's books
American picture books
Books about cats
Books about Jews and Judaism
Works about pianos and pianists